Music of Yugoslavia is music created during the existence of Yugoslavia, spanning the period between 1918 and 1992. The most significant music scene developed in the later period of the Socialist Federal Republic of Yugoslavia, and includes internationally acclaimed artists such as: the alternative music acts Laibach and Disciplina Kičme which appeared on MTV; classical music artists such as Ivo Pogorelić and Stefan Milenković; folk artists such as the Roma music performer Esma Redžepova; the musicians of the YU Rock Misija contribution to Bob Geldof's Band Aid; the Eurovision Song Contest performers such as the 1989 winners Riva and Tereza Kesovija, who represented Monaco at the Eurovision Song Contest 1966 and her own country in 1972, and plenty of others. Accordingly, the most widespread current formal and informal use of the term Music of Yugoslavia both locally and internationally always refers to the music of the Second Yugoslavia. Examples of the usage: ex-Yugoslav bands, the rock scene in the former Yugoslavia etc.

Categories

Music of SFR Yugoslavia
SFR Yugoslav pop and rock scene - which includes pop music and rock music incl. all their genres and subgenres.
New wave music in Yugoslavia
Sarajevo school of pop rock
Punk rock in Yugoslavia
New Primitivism
Yu-Mex
YU Rock Misija
Yugoslavia in the Eurovision Song Contest
Narodna muzika - which includes traditional folk music, both rural and urban.
Novokomponovana narodna muzika or Novokomponirana narodna muzika - newly composed folk music (not incl. Turbofolk, which rose to popularity during the Federal Republic of Yugoslavia and has a separate article)

Record labels
Jugoton (Zagreb)
PGP-RTB (Belgrade)
Suzy (Zagreb)
ZKP RTLJ (Ljubljana)
Diskoton (Sarajevo)
Jugodisk (Belgrade)

Ex-Yugoslav countries
For the music of the entities that emerged after the breakup of Yugoslavia in 1991 see:
Music of Bosnia and Herzegovina
Music of Croatia
Music of Montenegro
Music of North Macedonia
Music of Serbia (and its autonomous regions: Music of Vojvodina and Music of Kosovo)
Music of Slovenia

Notes

 
Balkan music
Southeastern European music
Bosnia and Herzegovina music history
Croatian music history
Kosovan music
Macedonian music
Montenegrin music
Serbian music history
Music history of Slovenia